Slămneşti may refer to:
 Slămneşti, a village in Brăduleț Commune, Argeș County, Romania
 Slămneşti, a village in Crușeț Commune, Gorj County, Romania